Luboš Hilgert (born 17 December 1986) is a Czech slalom canoeist who has competed at the international level since 2004.

He won a bronze medal in the K1 team event at the 2007 ICF Canoe Slalom World Championships in Foz do Iguaçu.

He is the son of successful canoe slalom paddlers Štěpánka Hilgertová and Luboš Hilgert. Amálie Hilgertová is his cousin.

World Cup individual podiums

References

1986 births
Czech male canoeists
Living people
Medalists at the ICF Canoe Slalom World Championships